{{DISPLAYTITLE:Tau1 Lupi}}

Tau1 Lupi, Latinized from τ1 Lupi, is a solitary star in the southern constellation of Lupus. It is visible to the naked eye with an apparent visual magnitude of 4.5. Based upon an annual parallax shift of only 2.99 mas as seen from Earth, it is located about 1,090 light years from the Sun. It is a member of the Upper Centaurus–Lupus sub-group of the nearby Sco OB2 association.

This is a B-type subgiant star with a stellar classification of B2 IV. It was determined to be a Beta Cephei variable based on observations during 1955 at the Cape Observatory. Tau1 Lupi shows a steady period of 0.17736934 days, corresponding to a frequency of 5.637953 cycles per day, with an amplitude of 0.035 in visual magnitude. It has around 10 times the mass of the Sun and 7 times the Sun's radius.

The star shows an infrared excess, which is unusual for a non-emission star of this class. The inner edge of the dust lies at a distance of 980 AU from the star with a temperature of 190 K, and it extends outward to as much as 50,000 AU where the temperature drops to 40 K. This optically thin dust is not related to the pulsational behavior of the star.

References

B-type subgiants
Beta Cephei variables
Runaway stars
Lupus (constellation)
Lupi, Tau1
Durchmusterung objects
126341
070574
5395
Upper Centaurus Lupus